Blackjack is a popular casino-gambling card game.

Black Jack or Blackjack may also refer to:

Places

Australia 
 Black Jack, Queensland, a locality in Queensland
 Black Jack, a civil parish of Pottinger County, New South Wales
 Black Jack Hill, near Gunnedah, New South Wales

United States 
 Black Jack (Red Oak, North Carolina), a historic plantation house
 Black Jack, Kansas, an unincorporated community
 Black Jack, Kentucky, an unincorporated community
 Black Jack, Missouri, a city
 Blackjack, Cherokee County, Texas, an unincorporated community
 Blackjack, Smith County, Texas, an unincorporated community

People
 Black Jack (nickname)
 Ada Blackjack (1898–1983), Inuit woman
 Roddy Blackjack (c. 1920–2013), Canadian elder and former Chief of the Little Salmon/Carmacks First Nation of the Yukon Territory
 Blackjack Lanza (born 1935), ring name of former professional wrestler John Lanza
 Blackjack Mulligan (1942–2016), ring name of former professional wrestler Robert Jack Windham
 "Blackjack" Hoss Taylor, a professional wrestler from  All-Star Wrestling

Arts and entertainment

Fictional characters
 Black Jack (manga character), the main character of the 1973 manga series of the same name
 Blackjack (Transformers), a fictional character in the Transformers universe
Nickname for Jonathon Randal, a supporting character in the Outlander (book series) and Outlander (TV series)

Films
 Black Jack (1927 film), an American silent Western film
 Black Jack (1950 film), written and directed by Julien Duvivier
 Black Jack (1979 film), by Ken Loach
 Blackjack (1978 film), an American crime drama film
 Blackjack (1990 film), directed by Colin Nutley
 Blackjack (1998 film), a TV movie directed by John Woo
 BlackJack (film series) (2003–2007), a series of Australian seven TV movies starring Colin Friels

Games and cards
 Black Jack (Hearts), a variant of Hearts
 Black Jack (Switch), also known as Switch, a name given to some variations of Crazy Eights in United Kingdom
 A jack (playing card) from a black suit, a jack of clubs or jack of spades
 Blackjack (Atari 2600 video game), a video game cartridge developed by Atari
 Blackjack, an NES video game developed by Odyssey Software; See American Video Entertainment

Literature
 Black Jack (manga), a 1973 manga series by Osamu Tezuka
 "Black Jack", a short story by Rudyard Kipling in the collection Soldiers Three
 Black Jack, a 2003 novel by Finnish writer Reijo Mäki
 Black Jack, a 1968 historical fiction novel by English writer Leon Garfield

Music
 Blackjack, a 21-note scale in the miracle temperament

Groups
 Black Jack (Chilean band), a Chilean rock band
 Black Jack (Australian band), an Australian heavy metal band
 Blackjack (American band), an American rock band
 BlackJack (Swedish band), a Swedish dansband

Albums
 Blackjack (Blackjack album), by the American band, 1979
 Blackjack (Donald Byrd album), 1968

Songs
 "Black Jack", by The Hives from Barely Legal
 "Black Jack", by Junkie XL from Big Sounds of the Drags
 "Black Jacks", by Girls Aloud from Tangled Up
 "Blackjack", by Airbourne from Runnin' Wild
 "Blackjack", by Aminé from OnePointFive
 "Blackjack", by Death Grips from The Money Store
 "Blackjack", by Everclear from Slow Motion Daydream
 "Blackjack", by Ray Charles from Yes Indeed!

Television
 "Black Jack" (Jericho episode), a 2007 episode of the television series Jericho
 Blackjack (Fear the Walking Dead), a 2018 episode of Fear the Walking Dead
 "BlackJack", a 2007 episode of SpongeBob SquarePants
 "Blackjack", an episode of the TV series The Adventures of Ellery Queen

Brands and enterprises
 Black Jack (confectionery), aniseed flavour chews
 Black Jack (gum), a brand of chewing gum
 BlackJack (phone), a mobile phone made by Samsung
 BlackJack II (phone), a mobile phone made by Samsung
 Blackjack Pizza, a chain of pizza delivery restaurants in Colorado, US

Military and law enforcement
 Blackjack (weapon), a type of baton for law enforcement
 RQ-21 Blackjack, a small tactical unmanned air system
 Black Jack Brigade, nickname of the U.S. 2nd Brigade Combat Team, 1st Cavalry Division
 Tupolev Tu-160 (NATO reporting name: Blackjack), a Russian bomber
 VMF-441, nicknamed The Blackjacks, a United States Marine Corps fighter squadron
 Battle of Black Jack, a battle in Kansas preceding the American Civil War
 National Society of Blackjacks, a High School Junior Reserve Officer Training Corps leadership program in the United States

Science
 Black jack (fish) (Caranx lugubris), a gamefish  
 Blackjack oak or Quercus marilandica, a small tree
 Black jack, often weedy plants of the genus Bidens from the family of Asteraceae
 Sphalerite, a mineral sometimes called black-jack by miners

Sports

Berlin Blackjacks, a short-lived team in the Ligue Nord-Américaine de Hockey
Ottawa BlackJacks, a team in the Canadian Elite Basketball League

Other uses
 Black Jack (horse) (1947–1976), a horse used in U.S. Armed Forces full honors funerals
 Black Jack (stamp), a United States postage stamp
 STV Black Jack, a 1904 Canadian brigantine sailing ship
 The Blackjacks, a professional wrestling tag team

See also

 Blakdyak (1969-2016), Filipino actor and singer
 Blak Jak (born 1983), American rapper
 Blk Jks, signifying Black Jacks, South African rock band
 John Gotti (1940-2002), nicknamed "Black John", U.S. mobster
 Jack of clubs (disambiguation)
 Jack of spades (disambiguation)
 Jack Black (disambiguation)
 John Black (disambiguation)
 
 
 
 
 Black (disambiguation)
 Jack (disambiguation)